Pål Sandli (born 1 July 1957) is a Norwegian rower. He competed in the men's quadruple sculls event at the 1984 Summer Olympics.

References

External links
 

1957 births
Living people
Norwegian male rowers
Olympic rowers of Norway
Rowers at the 1984 Summer Olympics
Sportspeople from Drammen